Josep María Abarca Platas (born June 19, 1974, in Barcelona) is a water polo player from Spain. He was a member of the national team that won the gold medal at the 1996 Summer Olympics in Atlanta, Georgia.

See also
 Spain men's Olympic water polo team records and statistics
 List of Olympic champions in men's water polo
 List of Olympic medalists in water polo (men)

References

External links
 

1974 births
Living people
Water polo players from Barcelona
Spanish male water polo players
Water polo drivers
Water polo players at the 1996 Summer Olympics
Medalists at the 1996 Summer Olympics
Olympic gold medalists for Spain in water polo
20th-century Spanish people
Sportsmen from Catalonia